Class 810 may refer to:

British Rail Class 810
ČD Class 810